Kingswinford was a parliamentary constituency centred on the town of Kingswinford in Staffordshire.  It returned one Member of Parliament (MP)  to the House of Commons of the Parliament of the United Kingdom.

The constituency was created for the 1885 general election, and abolished for the 1950 general election, when the new Brierley Hill constituency took over much of the area, Brierley Hill Urban District having already absorbed much of Kingswinford Rural District more than a decade earlier.

Boundaries

1885-1918
The Sessional Divisions of Bilston, Kingswinford, Wordsley, Rowley Regis, Sedgley, Willenhall, Wolverhampton and the municipal borough of Wolverhampton.

1918-1950
The Urban Districts of Amblecote, Brierley Hill, Quarry Bank, and Rowley Regis, and the Rural District of Kingswinford.

Members of Parliament

Contributions in Parliament by Kingswinford MPs

Mr Alexander Hill November 24, 1885 - October  1, 1900

Mr William Webb October  1, 1900-June 14, 1905

Mr Charles Sitch December 14, 1918-October 27, 1931

Mr Alan Todd October 27, 1931-November 14, 1935

Mr Arthur Henderson November 14, 1935-February 23, 1950

Election results 1885-1918

Elections in the 1880s

Elections in the 1890s

Elections in the 1900s

Elections in the 1910s 

General Election 1914–15:

Another General Election was required to take place before the end of 1915. The political parties had been making preparations for an election to take place and by the July 1914, the following candidates had been selected; 
Unionist: Henry Staveley-Hill
Liberal: Geoffrey Mander

Election results 1918-1949

Elections in the 1910s

Elections in the 1920s

Elections in the 1930s

Elections in the 1940s

References 

Parliamentary constituencies in Staffordshire (historic)
Constituencies of the Parliament of the United Kingdom established in 1885
Constituencies of the Parliament of the United Kingdom disestablished in 1950